Shirley Meier is a Canadian author of science fiction and fantasy. in addition to her own fiction she has also collaborated with S. M. Stirling, Steve White, and Karen Wehrstein.

Background
Shirley Meier was born in Woodstock, Ontario in 1960. she attended the University of Western Ontario. She lives in Toronto. She was active in the Bunch of Seven, Canada's first speculative fiction writing group.

She learned Tao Zen Chuan karate under Bill Chong and Way Lem, obtaining her black belt in 1991. She became an instructor herself, and taught a course in Women's Self-Defense for several years.

Bibliography

Non-Fiction
Columnist for Amazing Stories, Hard Copy Relaunch

Novels

Fifth Millennium series
 The Sharpest Edge (NAL, 1986), with S. M. Stirling
 The Cage (Baen Books, 1989), with S. M. Stirling
 Shadow's Daughter (Baen Books, 1991)
 Shadow's Son (Baen Books, 1991), with S. M. Stirling and Karen Wehrstein
 Saber & Shadow (Baen Books, 1992), with S. M. Stirling
 Blood Marble: Eclipse Court Book One (Lutria Press, 2021)
 Gilded Filth: Eclipse Court Book Two (Lutria Press, 2021)
 Prince Under The Mountain: Eclipse Court Book Three (Lutria Press, 2021)
 Scholar's Run: Eclipse Court Book Four (Lutria Press, 2022)
 Burning Crystal: Eclipse Court Book Five (Lutria Press, 2021)
 From Eclipse to Diamond Sun Court: Eclipse Court Book Six (Lutria Press 2023)

Starfire series
 Exodus (Baen Books, 2007), with Steve White

Two Gods, Two Worlds series 
 Sparks in the Wind, e-book and print on demand
 "Shadow of a Soul on Fire" by Henchman Press ( July 2018)

Young Adult Fiction 
 Lamia's Daughter, (Huntress Press, 2020), e-book and print on demand (

Short fiction
 "Peacock Eyes", Friends of the Witch World 2 anthology
 "Trave", Magic in Ithkar 4
 "The Witches' Tree", Northern Frights; audio adaptation for Fears for Ears CD 
 "Ice", Northern Frights II
 "You're It ", Bolos: The Unconquerable (Baen Books)
 "Pursued by the Tauwu", Rogues In Hell (2011)
 "Under the Bed", What Scares the Bogeyman(2011)
 "The Other Musgrave Ritual", (Terror by Gaslight from Iron Clad Press) 2014
 "An Arrow's Flight", "Amazing Stories" 2018
 "Seal Hunt", Migration Anthology  2019 by "Other Worlds Ink" (Honorable Mention)
 "SwanMaiden's Daughter", "Of Fae and Fate" Anthology 2019
 "Buyer Beware, Amazing Stories 2019
 "Upon Reflection", Clarity Anthology 2021 by "Other Worlds Ink"

Poetry
 "Mummy Bones" (in Tessaracts 7)
 "Flowers and Vice" (poetry book)
 "The Love Machine" (poetry book)
 "Angelwings in My Coffee" (poetry book)
 "Underhill Transit Service"; Lutria press 2023, ebook, paperback

Artwork
cover: (with design by Karen Wehrstein) Sparks in the Wind;

cover: (front and back) for Shadow of a Soul on Fire;

cover: (front cover) Lamia's Daughter; 

cover: Blood Marble: Book One of Eclipse Court;

cover: Gilded Filth: Book Two of Eclipse Court;
cover: Scholar's Run: Book Four of Eclipse Court;

cover: Burning Crystal: Book Five of Eclipse Court;

five sumi ink drawings;
Dragon's Eye acrylic painting on 30 cm canvas;

cover: From Eclipse to Diamond Sun Court;

References
 Author Biography

External links
 Shirley's Place author website
 Vryka artist website

An audio interview with Ira Nayman, Editor, Amazing Stories: https://listen.amazingstories.com/?name=2019-07-18_shirleymeierinterview.mp3

Canadian science fiction writers
Canadian women novelists
Women science fiction and fantasy writers
1960 births
Living people
People from Woodstock, Ontario
University of Western Ontario alumni
Writers from Ontario
Canadian women short story writers
20th-century Canadian novelists
20th-century Canadian short story writers
20th-century Canadian women writers
21st-century Canadian novelists
21st-century Canadian short story writers
21st-century Canadian women writers